Tichla is a small town in the Western Sahara under the de facto control of Morocco, which considers it as part of  rural commune Aousserd Province in the Dakhla-Oued Ed-Dahab region. At the time of the 2004 census, the commune had a total population of 6,036 people living in 102 households.  A few kilometers away is the Tichla Fortress.

References

Populated places in Aousserd Province